Melanoides polymorpha is a species of freshwater snail with a gill and an operculum, an aquatic gastropod mollusk in the family Thiaridae.

This species is endemic to Lake Malawi and is found in Malawi, Tanzania, and Mozambique. It is very abundant throughout the lake in the littoral soft sediments.

References

Thiaridae
Freshwater snails of Africa
Invertebrates of Malawi
Invertebrates of Mozambique
Invertebrates of Tanzania
Taxa named by Edgar Albert Smith
Gastropods described in 1877
Taxonomy articles created by Polbot
Fauna of Lake Malawi